Robert Wojsyk (born September 11, 1990 in Tarnowskie Góry) is a Polish footballer who currently plays for Ruch Radzionków in the Polish III Liga

Notes
 

Polish footballers
1990 births
Living people
Polonia Bytom players
GKS Tychy players
Rozwój Katowice players
Ruch Radzionków players
People from Tarnowskie Góry
Sportspeople from Silesian Voivodeship
Association football forwards